Giannis Mallous (born 7 February 1974) is a Greek former professional footballer who played as a right-back.

Career
Mallous started his career in Agia Triada and later he played in Philippos Melikis. In 1994, he moved to Veria, with which he played in A Ethniki, when his team promoted in A Ethniki. In 1999, he went to Aris Thessaloniki, in where he played five and half seasons. Mallous played with Aris in UEFA cup and the Greek cup final.

In summer of 2004 he returned in Veria and the following year he went to Agrotikos Asteras, in where he stopped his career, in 2009.

Statistics in Greek Superleague

Honours
Aris Thessaloniki
Greek Football Cup: Runner up (2002–03)

References

External links
athlitikihxo.gr, Στον Άρη ο Μαλλούς
archive.sport.gr, Τελικός Κυπέλλου Ελλάδος 2003:Γιάννης Μαλλούς
enet.gr, Το πρόσωπο της αγωνιστικής:Γιάννης Μαλλούς

Greek footballers
Aris Thessaloniki F.C. players
Super League Greece players
1974 births
Living people
Association football defenders